The 2006 Stockport Metropolitan Borough Council election took place on 4 May 2006 to elect members of Stockport Metropolitan Borough Council in England. This was on the same day as other local elections. One third of the council was up for election, with each successful candidate serving a four-year term of office, expiring in 2010. The Liberal Democrats held overall control of the council.

Result summary

Ward results

Bramhall North

Bramhall South and Woodford

Bredbury and Woodley

Bredbury Green and Romiley

Brinnington and Central

Cheadle and Gatley

Cheadle Hulme North

Cheadle Hulme South

Davenport and Cale Green

Edgeley and Cheadle Heath

Hazel Grove

Heald Green

Heatons North

Heatons South

Manor

Marple North

Marple South

Offerton

Reddish North

Reddish South

Stepping Hill

References

2006 English local elections
2006
2000s in Greater Manchester